The Wakeley-Giles Commercial Building is located in Madison, Wisconsin. It was listed on the National Register of Historic Places in 1988 and on the State Register of Historic Places the following year.

References

Commercial buildings on the National Register of Historic Places in Wisconsin
National Register of Historic Places in Madison, Wisconsin
Buildings and structures in Madison, Wisconsin
Brick buildings and structures
Commercial buildings completed in 1869